Koroba-Kopiago District is a district of the Hela Province of Papua New Guinea.  Its capital is Koroba.  The population was 136,876 at the 2011 census.

References

Districts of Papua New Guinea
Hela Province